Pygopristis denticulata, or the Lobetoothed Piranha is a species of piranha. These fish are part of the group Ostariophysi, a large group of freshwater fish that includes minnows and catfishes. It is a rare South American fish found in the Orinoco River basin, north and eastern Guiana Shield rivers, and tributaries of the lower Amazon River. Piranhas typically live in freshwater, but other specimens can be found elsewhere. Specimens of this species is frequently found in acidic clear or black waters. Piranhas are primarily known for being savage, flesh-eating fish, but they actually have broader diets.  They usually feed on aquatic insects, small fish, and fruits.

P. denticulata has pentacuspid teeth and a middle cusp that is usually only slightly larger than the other cusps. This is unlike the piranhas, which have tricuspid teeth with a larger middle cusp, making the teeth appear triangular.

P. denticulata grows to about 20.0 cm (7.9 in) in TL. It has 62 chromosomes. This fish possesses powerful dentition that can cause serious bites. It has scales.

References

Serrasalmidae
Piranhas
Monotypic fish genera
Fish of Brazil
Fish described in 1819
Taxa named by Georges Cuvier